Joseph Adam (born 1 May 1965) is a Seychellois sprinter. He competed in the men's 400 metres at the 1992 Summer Olympics.

References

External links
 

1965 births
Living people
Athletes (track and field) at the 1992 Summer Olympics
Seychellois male sprinters
Olympic athletes of Seychelles
Commonwealth Games competitors for Seychelles
Athletes (track and field) at the 1990 Commonwealth Games
Place of birth missing (living people)